Montenegrin municipal elections were held in 1998.

Results

Berane

Cetinje

Danilovgrad

Plav

Podgorica

Plužine

Rožaje

Tivat

Ulcinj

External links
Centre for Monitoring (CeMi): Results of the municipal elections 1998

1998
Montenegro
1998 in Montenegro
Elections in Serbia and Montenegro